Purpurite is a mineral, manganese phosphate, MnPO4 with varying amounts of iron depending upon its source.  It occurs in color ranges from brownish black via purple and violet to dark red.

Purpurite forms a series with the iron-bearing endmember heterosite, FePO4.

See also
Manganese violet

References 

Manganese(III) minerals
Iron(III) minerals
Phosphate minerals
Orthorhombic minerals
Minerals in space group 53